Che Shiwei (born 30 October 1996) is a Chinese footballer who currently plays as a midfielder for Kunshan.

Club career
Che Shiwei joined China League One side Hebei China Fortune from Dalian Aerbin on 27 February 2015. He made his senior debut on 15 April 2015 in a 2015 Chinese FA Cup match against Guangxi Longguida. On 23 May 2015, he made his league debut in a 2–1 away win against Hunan Billows, coming on as a substitute for Zhu Haiwei in the 59th minute. He played five league matches in the 2015 season as Hebei won promotion to the Chinese Super League. Che played for Hebei China Fortune's reserve team in 2016. He failed to pass the trial of China League Two side Yinchuan Helanshan in July 2016. Che returned to the first team squad in 2017. On 11 March 2017, Che made his Super League debut in a 1–1 away draw against Chongqing Lifan as the benefit of the new rule of the Super League that at least one Under-23 player must in the starting. He scored his first senior goal in the match.

After several seasons as a squad player for Hebei, he would join another top tier club in Tianjin TEDA on 14 February 2020 in a three year contract. He would go on to make his debut in a league game on 6 August 2020 against Beijing Guoan in a 3-1 defeat. Che would go on to struggle to gain much more playing time throughout his stay at Tianjin and would be dropped to the reserves the following season before becoming a free agent and then joining second tier club Kunshan on 28 August 2022. He would go on to make his debut in a league game on 29 August 2022 against Qingdao Youth Island in a 1-0 victory. He would go on to establish himself as regular within the team and was part of the squad that won the division and promotion to the top tier at the end of the 2022 China League One campaign.

Career statistics
.

Honours

Club 
Kunshan
 China League One: 2022

References

External links
 

1996 births
Living people
Chinese footballers
Footballers from Dalian
Hebei F.C. players
Tianjin Jinmen Tiger F.C. players
Chinese Super League players
China League One players
Association football midfielders